Washington Township is a township in Doniphan County, Kansas, USA.  As of the 2000 census, its population was 3,066.

History
Washington Township was organized in 1855.

Geography
According to the USGS, it contains two cemeteries: Belmont and Tambor.

The streams of Duncan Creek and Peters Creek run through this township.

References

 USGS Geographic Names Information System (GNIS)

External links
 US-Counties.com
 City-Data.com

Townships in Doniphan County, Kansas
Townships in Kansas
1855 establishments in Kansas Territory